Cipher System is a Swedish melodic death metal band from Tjörn.

The band formed under the name Eternal Grief in 1995. They changed their name in 2001 to Cipher System.

The band released their first album Central Tunnel Eight by Lifeforce Records on 2 November 2004. After some years of silence the band spent several months between 2010 and 2011 with that on their own to record a new album. The album was mixed at Studio Fredman and was entitled Communicate the Storms. Shortly after the album was finished, it was announced that the band signed with Nuclear Blast, and the album was released by the label on 9 September 2011.

History

Members

Current members
 Johan Eskilsson – guitars, clean vocals (1995–present)
 Henric Liljesand  – bass (1995–present)
 Christian Älvestam – lead vocals (2020–present)

Session members
 Janne Jaloma – drums (2020–present)

Former members
 Pontus Andersson – drums (1995–2008)
 Andreas Johansson – guitars (1995–1999)
 Daniel Schöldström – lead vocals (1997–1999, 2001–2005)
 Peter Engström – keyboards (2001–2020)
 Magnus Öhlander – guitars (2002–2007)
 Jimmie Strimell – lead vocals (2005–2008)
 Andreas Allenmark – guitars (2008–2020)
 Andreas Solveström – lead vocals (2008–2009)
 Pontus Hjelm – guitars, clean vocals (2008–2009)
 Emil Frisk – drums (2009–2020)
 Karl Obbel – lead vocals (2010–2020)

Timeline

Discography

Studio albums
Central Tunnel Eight (2004)
Communicate the Storms (2011)

Demos
as Eternal Grief
Path of Delight (1998)
Raped by Chaos (1999)
Awakening of Shadows (2000)

as Cipher System
Eyecon (2002)
Promo 2003 (2003)
Promo 2006 (2006)
Promo 2009 (2009)

Split
Cipher System / By Night (2004)

References

External links 
MySpace
Encyclopedia Metallum

Swedish melodic death metal musical groups
Musical groups established in 1995
Musical quintets
Nuclear Blast artists